Conus bayani, common name the Bayan's cone, is a species of sea snail, a marine gastropod mollusk in the family Conidae, the cone snails and their allies.

Like all species within the genus Conus, these snails are predatory and venomous. They are capable of "stinging" humans, therefore live ones should be handled carefully or not at all.

Description
The size of an adult shell varies between 45 mm and 70 mm. The white shell has longitudinal streaks and clouds of light chestnut, forming two interrupted broad bands, upon which are vestiges of a few narrow revolving lines of chocolate.

Distribution
This marine species occurs in the Western Indian Ocean.

References

 Jousseaume, F., 1872. Description de 3 espèces nouvelles de mollusques (deux cônes et une marginelle). Revue et Magasin de Zoologie Pure et Appliquée 23(2): 198–211, 1pl
 Röckel, D., Korn, W. & Kohn, A.J., 1995. Manual of the living Conidae. Volume 1: Indo-Pacific region. Hemmen: 517 pp
 Filmer R.M. (2001). A Catalogue of Nomenclature and Taxonomy in the Living Conidae 1758 – 1998. Backhuys Publishers, Leiden. 388pp
 Tucker J.K. (2009). Recent cone species database. September 4, 2009 Edition
 Puillandre N., Duda T.F., Meyer C., Olivera B.M. & Bouchet P. (2015). One, four or 100 genera? A new classification of the cone snails. Journal of Molluscan Studies. 81: 1–23

External links
 The Conus Biodiversity website
 
 Cone Shells – Knights of the Sea
 Syntype in MNHN, Paris

bayani
Gastropods described in 1872